Alfredo Héctor Zacarías Bustos (born November 21, 1941) is a Mexican screenwriter, film producer, film director, and songwriter. He is the son of director Miguel Zacarías.

Selected filmography
Cada quién su lucha (1966)
Los cuatro Juanes (1966)
Dos pintores pintorescos (1967)
Capulina Speedy González (1970)
Jesús, nuestro Señor (1971)
El bueno para nada (1973)
Capulina contra las momias (1973)
Demonoid (1981)
The Pearl (2001)

References

External links

1941 births
Living people
Mexican screenwriters
Mexican film producers
Mexican film directors
Mexican songwriters
Male songwriters
People from Mexico City
Mexican people of Lebanese descent